SpaceSniffer is a freeware computer disk space analyser from Uderzo Software for Microsoft Windows platforms. It uses a treemap to visualise disk usage.



History 

Developed by Uderzo Software (run by Umberto Uderzo) in Italy, SpaceSniffer was first released in 2009.

Features 

SpaceSniffer comes in a single edition that runs on the Windows operating platform (from Windows 2000). The executable file can be simply copied without requiring any other installation process.

It is free for all uses, but donations are suggested. No source code is available.

Notable features include:
A treemap represents how disk capacity is allocated.
Filters (based on file name, age, size, etc.) enable the user to focus the visualisation on files and folders of interest.
User-chosen colours can be associated to different file types.
NTFS Alternate Data Streams are supported.
commandline usage (non-graphical, consolle usage)

Reception 

The application has been reviewed favourably by editors and users. PCWorld concluded its review by pronouncing it a “recommended download” and Freewaregenius.com called it “a very well made program that is simple, intuitive, elegant, and very useful”.

Reviewers and users have noted that the treemap presentation “can be a bit overwhelming at times” or “cluttered and more complex than necessary” but concluded that it was “effective”.

Similar programs 
 For Windows WinDirStat, SequoiaView
 For KDE: KDirStat, which inspired WinDirStat
 For GTK: GdMap
 For Mac OS X: Disk Inventory X

References

External links 
Product page on the publisher's web site

Disk usage analysis software